Silverdalen (Swedish for The Silver Valley) is a locality situated in Hultsfred Municipality, Kalmar County, Sweden with 725 inhabitants in 2010.

The Nässjö - Oskarshamn railway line passes through the settlement since 1874. It was given the name Silverdalen in 1931. Before that it was either called Hällefors or Råsa-Lönneberga. The paper mill located here was founded around 1874 and was in operation until year 2002 when M-real (which had taken over as owner in 2000) closed down its operation.

References 

Populated places in Kalmar County
Populated places in Hultsfred Municipality